The Burleigh Bears are an Australian professional rugby league football club based in Gold Coast, Australia. They compete in Queensland's top rugby league competition, the Queensland Cup.

Since their admission to the competition in 1997, the club has appeared in six Grand Finals, winning four (1999, 2004, 2016 and 2019) and won the minor premiership twice (2003 and 2004). The team's leagues club and home ground, Pizzey Park, are located in the Gold Coast suburb of Miami. They currently serve as one of the feeder clubs for the Gold Coast Titans.

History 
Formed in 1934 by Bob Singh, originally based out of Rudd Park in Burleigh, the Bears relocated to Currumbin in 1959 after a nine-year cessation. In 1971, they relocated, this time to their current home, Pizzey Park, in Burleigh's neighbouring suburb of Miami.

Originally, the Bears competed in the Gold Coast Group 18 competition, before they were admitted to the state's top competition, the Queensland Cup, in 1997. Rick Stone, coached the Bears for 13 seasons, leading them to two premierships, in 1999 and 2004, before returning to the club in 2020 after his predecessor, Jim Lenihan, was promoted to assistant coach of the Gold Coast Titans.

The Bears have had an affiliation with the Titans since 2007. The Bears briefly became a feeder side to the Brisbane Broncos in 2008, before aligning back to the Titans in 2009. On 6 December 2019, it was revealed the Bears had extended their affiliation agreement with the Titans until the end of the 2022 season.

Results

Queensland Cup 
1997 - 4th
1998 - 8th
1999 - 3rd (Premiers)
2000 - 4th 
2001 - 2nd
2002 - 4th
2003 - 1st (runners-up)
2004 - 1st (Premiers)
2005 - 3rd (runners-up)
2006 - 6th
2007 - 7th
2008 - 6th
2009 - 7th
2010 - 7th
2011 - 7th
2012 - 9th
2013 - 11th
2014 - 7th
2015 - 9th
2016 - 2nd (Premiers)
2017 - 10th
2018 - 2nd
2019 - 3rd (Premiers)

Players

Honours

Queensland Cup
 Premierships: 4
  1999, 2004, 2016, 2019
 Runners Up: 2
  2003, 2005
 Minor Premiership: 2
  2003, 2004

Records
Most games for club
201, Shane O'Flanagan
160, Ali Brown
146, Martin Griese
139, Ryan Gundry
135, Robert Apanui

Most points for club
1281, Taine Tuaupiki
964, Reggie Cressbrook
761, Nick Parfitt
660, Jamal Fogarty
486, Greg Bourke
276, Trent Purdon

Most tries for club
70, Kurtis Rowe
69, Reggie Cressbrook
69, Trent Purdon
66, Aseri Laing
61, Nick Shaw
59, Aaron Douglas

See also

National Rugby League reserves affiliations
List of rugby league clubs in Australia

References

External links
Burleigh Bears Official Website
QRL Profile

 
Rugby league teams on the Gold Coast, Queensland
Rugby league teams in Queensland
1934 establishments in Australia
Rugby clubs established in 1934